All Out War is the second album by American groove metal band Incite, released on November 20, 2012, on Minus Head Records. The album was produced by Logan Mader in Phoenix and has been supported by the Maximum Cavalera Tour, supporting Soulfly along with Lody Kong. The album has received positive reviews from critics.

Track listing

Credits

Personnel 
Richie Cavalera – vocals
Kevin "Dis" McAllister - guitars
Luis Marrufo – bass guitar
Zak Solafy – drums

Production 
Logan Mader – mixing, mastering

References 

2012 albums
Incite albums
Albums produced by Logan Mader